The Bhopal–Nagpur section is a railway line connecting Bhopal and . This  track is part of the Delhi–Chennai line. The section is under the jurisdiction of West Central Railway and Central Railway.

History
The Bhopal–Itarsi line was opened by the Begum of Bhopal in 1884. Itarsi was linked with Nagpur between 1923 and 1924.  The Bhopal–itarsi-Nagpur line became part of the Delhi–Chennai line in 1929.

Electrification
The Bhopal–Itarsi sector was electrified in 1988–89 and the Nagpur–Itarsi sector in 1990–91.

Speed limits
The Delhi–Chennai Central line (Grand Trunk route) is classified as a "Group A" line which can take speeds up to 160 km/h.

Passenger movement

Loco sheds and workshops
Itarsi diesel shed holds 145+ locos. It has WDM-2, WDM-3A, WDM-3D, WDS-6 and WDP-4 diesel locos. This shed serves routes all across central India. Itarsi electric loco shed came up in the 1980s. It holds WAM-4, WAP-4 and WAG-5 electric locos. Its WAG-5 locos perform banking duties on the Budni–Barkhera Ghat section. There are also ghat sections between Teegaon–Chinchoda and Dharakhoh–Maramjhiri In Bhopal–Nagpur section where bankers are attached to trains. Broad Gauge Coach Workshop at Bhopal handles rebuilding and overhaul of old passenger coaches. There is a coach maintenance workshop at Nagpur.

References

External links
 Trains at Bhopal
trains at Itarsi
Trains at Nagpur

5 ft 6 in gauge railways in India
Rail transport in Madhya Pradesh
Rail transport in Maharashtra
Railway lines opened in 1924
Transport in Bhopal
Transport in Nagpur